Ahalamshala Papa Alioune "Badou" Ndiaye (born 27 October 1990) is a Senegalese professional footballer who plays as a midfielder for Adana Demirspor. 

Badou began his career with Diambars in his native Senegal before moving to Norwegian side Bodø/Glimt in 2012. After impressing in Norway he joined Turkish Süper Lig side Osmanlıspor in 2015. He spent two years with Osmanlıspor before joining Galatasaray in August 2017 for a fee of €7.5 million. In January 2018 Badou signed for English Premier League club Stoke City for a fee of £14 million. Following Stoke's relegation in 2017–18, Badou re-joined Galatasaray on loan for the 2018–19 season.

Club career

Early career 
Badou was born in Dakar and grew up in Diamalaye as a son of an army officer and science teacher. Ndiaye began studying for a law degree whilst playing for local side Diambars. After a year into his studies he decided to pursue a career in football and went on trials at European clubs.

Bodø/Glimt 
After a successful trial with Norwegian club Bodø/Glimt he joined them on initially on loan in 2012. Having moved from Senegal to the Arctic Circle, Ndiaye admitted it was a culture shock.—"When I got up on the first day and opened the front door I was terrified. I had never seen snow before, or at least only on TV. Gradually I learned not to care about the weather. If it’s cold, then it’s cold. I have received that attitude from my parents; it’s important to adapt."

He made his debut in a 3–3 draw against Bærum. Before the 2013 season he signed a contract with Bodø/Glimt. He was awarded the Kniksenprisen prize for the best player in the Norwegian First Division 2013 while the team won promotion. Badou became a fan favorite at the Aspmyra Stadion and played every Tippeligaen match in 2014 as Bodø/Glimt successfully avoided relegation.

Osmanlıspor 
On 5 August 2015, Badou moved to Turkish side Osmanlıspor, for a reported transfer fee of €300,000. Badou scored 11 goals in 33 appearances in 2015–16, helping Osmanlıspor qualify for the UEFA Europa League. In 2016–17 he played 42 times scoring seven goals as the side finished in 13th position and reached the last 32 of the Europa League losing to Olympiacos.

Galatasaray 
On 4 August 2017, he moved to league rivals Galatasaray on a four-year contract, for a reported transfer fee of €7.5 million. Badou made 17 appearances in the first half of the 2017–18 season before he began talking to English clubs.

Stoke City
Badou joined English Premier League club Stoke City on 31 January 2018 for a fee of £14 million. Badou scored his first goal in English football on 22 April 2018 in a 1–1 draw against Burnley. Badou played 13 times for Stoke in 2017–18 as they were relegated to the EFL Championship. Badou started the first game of the 2018–19 season, a 3–1 defeat away at Leeds United where he was substituted by Gary Rowett and was heavily criticized by supporters for his performance. On 28 August 2018, Badou re-joined Galatasaray on a season-long loan. Badou played 33 times for Galatasaray in 2018–19 helping them win the Süper Lig and Turkish Cup. 

After spending the 2018–19 season back at Galatasaray, Badou returned to Stoke in the summer of 2019. After failing to secure a move away he was re-introduced into the side by Nathan Jones for the 2019–20 season. Jones was replaced by Michael O'Neill in November 2019 and Badou fell out of favor. He returned to Turkish football on 4 January 2020 signing on loan with Trabzonspor until the end of the 2019–20 season. He played 23 times for Trabzonspor, helping them finish 2nd in the Süper Lig and win the 2020 Turkish Cup after beating Alanyaspor 2–0 in the final.

Badou joined Fatih Karagümrük on loan for the 2020–21 season. Badou cut his loan with Fatih Karagümrük short in February to join Saudi Professional League side Al-Ain on loan.

Aris Thessaloniki 
On 22 July 2021, Badou joined Greek Super League side Aris Thessaloniki on a three-year contract. On 24 October 2021, he celebrated his first goal for the club in a 5-1 home win against Panetolikos.

International career
In May 2018 he was named in Senegal’s 23-man  squad for the 2018 World Cup in Russia.

Career statistics

Club

International 

Scores and results list Senegal's goal tally first, score column indicates score after each Ndiaye goal.

Honours

Club
Galatasaray
 Süper Lig: 2017–18, 2018–19
Turkish Cup: 2018–19

Trabzonspor
Turkish Cup: 2019–20

International
Senegal
Africa Cup of Nations runner-up: 2019
Individual
Eliteserien Player of the Year: 2013

References 

1990 births
Living people
Footballers from Dakar
Senegalese footballers
Association football midfielders
Diambars FC players
FK Bodø/Glimt players
Ankaraspor footballers
Galatasaray S.K. footballers
Stoke City F.C. players
Trabzonspor footballers
Fatih Karagümrük S.K. footballers
Al-Ain FC (Saudi Arabia) players
Aris Thessaloniki F.C. players
Senegal Premier League players
Eliteserien players
Norwegian First Division players
Süper Lig players
Premier League players
English Football League players
Saudi Professional League players
Super League Greece players
Senegalese expatriate footballers
Expatriate footballers in Norway
Expatriate footballers in Turkey
Expatriate footballers in England
Expatriate footballers in Saudi Arabia
Expatriate footballers in Greece
Senegalese expatriate sportspeople in Norway
Senegalese expatriate sportspeople in Turkey
Senegalese expatriate sportspeople in England
Senegalese expatriate sportspeople in Saudi Arabia
2017 Africa Cup of Nations players
2018 FIFA World Cup players
2019 Africa Cup of Nations players
Senegal international footballers